International Code of Nomenclature may refer to:

International Code of Nomenclature for algae, fungi, and plants (ICN), formerly the International Code of Botanical Nomenclature (ICBN)
International Code of Nomenclature of Bacteria (ICNB)
International Code of Nomenclature for Cultivated Plants (ICNCP)

See also
International Code of Phytosociological Nomenclature (ICPN)
International Code of Zoological Nomenclature (ICZN)
The nomenclature code of the International Committee on Taxonomy of Viruses (ICTV code)